The 1971 Texas Longhorns football team represented the University of Texas at Austin during the 1971 NCAA University Division football season.

Texas' hopes for a third consecutive national championship were squashed with back-to-back one-sided losses in October to its two biggest rivals, Oklahoma and Arkansas. The Longhorns recovered to win their fourth consecutive Southwest Conference championship and returned to the Cotton Bowl, where they were routed 30-6 by Penn State.

Schedule

Personnel

Season summary

Oregon

TCU

NFL Draft
Two seniors from the 1971 Longhorns were selected in the 1972 NFL Draft:

References

Texas
Texas Longhorns football seasons
Southwest Conference football champion seasons
Texas Longhorns football